Members of the New South Wales Legislative Assembly who served in the 35th parliament held their seats from 1947 to 1950. They were elected at the 1947 state election, and at by-elections. The Speaker was Bill Lamb.

See also
Second McGirr ministry
Results of the 1947 New South Wales state election
Candidates of the 1947 New South Wales state election

References

Members of New South Wales parliaments by term
20th-century Australian politicians